The Pierinae are a large subfamily of pierid butterflies. The subfamily is one of several clades of butterflies often referred to as the whites.

Species
It includes the following species (additional species can be found under the tribes listed in the adjacent box):

Anthocharis belia – Morocco orange tip
Anthocharis cethura – desert orangetip
Anthocharis cethura catalina – Catalina orangetip
Anthocharis damone – eastern orange tip
Anthocharis euphenoides – Provence orange tip
Anthocharis gruneri – Grüner's orange tip
Anthocharis julia – southern Rocky Mountain orangetip
Anthocharis lanceolata – gray marble
Anthocharis limonea – Mexican orangetip
Anthocharis midea – falcate orangetip
Anthocharis sara – Sara's orangetip
Anthocharis sara thoosa – southwestern orangetip
Anthocharis scolymus – yellow tip
Anthocharis stella – Stella orangetip
Anthocharis stella browningi – Utah Stella orangetip
Euchloe belemia – green-striped white
Euchloe charlonia – greenish black-tip
Euchloe crameri – western dappled white
Euchloe olympia – Olympia marble
Phoebis avellaneda – red-splashed sulphur
Pieris angelika – Arctic white
Pieris brassicae – large white
Pieris marginalis – margined white
Pieris marginalis reicheli – Reichel's margined white
Pieris oleracea – mustard white
Pieris oleracea frigida – Newfoundland white
Pieris rapae – small white
Pieris virginiensis – West Virginia white butterfly

References

Further reading 
 Glassberg, Jeffrey (2001). Butterflies through Binoculars, The West
 Guppy, Crispin S. and Shepard, Jon H. (2001). Butterflies of British Columbia
 James, David G. and Nunnallee, David (2011). Life Histories of Cascadia Butterflies
 Pelham, Jonathan (2008). Catalogue of the Butterflies of the United States and Canada
 Pyle, Robert Michael (2002). The Butterflies of Cascadia

External links 
 
 Pierinae at TOL Suggested phylogeny and images.
 Butterflies and Moths of North America
 Butterflies of America

 

Butterfly subfamilies